Lee B. Laskin (born June 30, 1936) is an American attorney, politician and judge who served in both houses of the New Jersey Legislature before being appointed to serve on the New Jersey Superior Court.

Personal life
Born in Atlantic City, New Jersey on June 30, 1936, Laskin attended Camden High School, graduating as part of the class of 1954. He did his undergraduate studies at American University and Temple University. After earning his law degree from Rutgers School of Law–Camden in 1960, he worked as a law clerk for William T. Cahill.

In 1962, Laskin was appointed by the City of Camden as an assistant city attorney. Two years later, he was appointed as an assistant United States Attorney. Starting in 1966, he entered private practice, working throughout Camden County as a municipal attorney and representing numerous boards of education, as well as various non-profit organizations He founded and served as chairman of Glendale National Bank.

He and his wife Andrea have one daughter, Shari and three grandchildren Samantha, Molly and Matthew Tarnopol.

Public service
Laskin was elected in 1967 together with Democrat John J. Horn to serve in the New Jersey General Assembly to represent Legislative District 3D, one of four pairs of representatives from the 3rd Legislative District, which was further divided into four Assembly districts (Districts 3A, 3B, 3C, and 3D); District 3D included portions of Camden County. He served in the Assembly for a single two-year term of office. In January 1968, Laskin was one of two Republican labor leaders who abstained from joining the Republican majority that voted by a 56–11 margin to repeal provisions in state law that had been passed by a Democratic majority in the previous session providing unemployment benefits to workers in labor disputes who were on strike or who had been locked out by their employer. In January 1969, Laskin was one of three legislators who had been identified by officials in the office of the New Jersey Attorney General as being "too comfortable with members of organized crime", allegations that Laskin called a "joke". Evidence was offered that Laskin had been a regular patron at a Mafia-controlled bar, but Laskin testified before an Assembly committee that he had been invited to the bar by a client and had had no knowledge of any mob connections. The assembly's special investigation committee chastised two legislators, but found that there was no evidence to support the claims against Laskin and three other elected officials.

In 1969, Laskin was elected to serve a three-year term on the Camden County Board of Chosen Freeholders.

In 1977, after one-term Democrat Alene S. Ammond lost the support of the Democratic Party establishment, Victor S. Pachter was placed on the primary ballot and was narrowly chosen as the Democratic nominee, while Laskin was chosen to fill the Republican ballot spot that had originally gone to Addison G. Bradley. In the November 1977 general election, Laskin beat Pachter by a 52%–48% margin. He was re-elected to office in 1981, 1983 and again in 1987, when he defeated Maria Barnaby Greenwald of Cherry Hill.

In 1986, Laskin was criticized by fellow Republicans in the Assembly for casting the final vote necessary to approve an additional term for New Jersey Supreme Court Chief Justice Robert N. Wilentz, a registered Democrat who had been dividing his residence between New Jersey and New York while his wife was undergoing chemotherapy. After being reassured that Wilentz was going to move back to New Jersey after his wife's medical condition had improved, Laskin cast the deciding vote that he described as "the most difficult day I've ever had in the legislature", returning Wilentz for an additional term on the Supreme Court by a 21–19 margin.

In his bid for re-election to a fifth term in office, Laskin lost to Democrat John Adler in the 1991 general election. Camden County Democratic Party boss George Norcross decided to target Laskin's seat, after the Senator refused to appoint Norcorss's father to a seat on the New Jersey Racing Commission; in addition to an effort to elect Democrats at the county level, Norcross recruited Adler to run against Laskin. In a particularly bitter race, Adler criticized what he called Laskin's "sweetheart patronage contracts" as attorney for several area municipalities, calling Laskin "parasitic and self-serving, the ultimate political hack", while Lakskin described Adler as "an absolute lunatic". Democrats targeted Laskin with a carefully planned "sneak attack" $250,000 advertising campaign designed to support Adler, after polling information showed that Laskin was particularly vulnerable. Adler charged that Laskin had used his Senate office and staff to distribute invitations to a campaign event and cited Laskin's poor attendance record, which Adler claimed was related to his legal work. Laskin became the only Republican incumbent to lose his seat in the wake of opposition to Democratic Governor James Florio's income tax plan.

In July 1994, Laskin was one of a group of five individuals nominated by Governor Christine Todd Whitman to serve a seven-year term on New Jersey Superior Court; the governor's office stated that he was selected "based on his qualifications, his background... and things like temperament and demeanor".

In September 1998, Judge Laskin ruled that a set of seven embryos created by a couple while they were married should be destroyed after their divorce. The ex-husband had wanted the embryos retained so that they might possibly be implanted or donated, while the ex-wife petitioned for their destruction.

References

1945 births
Living people
American University alumni
Camden High School (New Jersey) alumni
County commissioners in New Jersey
New Jersey lawyers
New Jersey state court judges
Republican Party members of the New Jersey General Assembly
Republican Party New Jersey state senators
Politicians from Atlantic City, New Jersey
Politicians from Cherry Hill, New Jersey
Rutgers School of Law–Camden alumni
Temple University alumni